Dia Al-Azzawi (Arabic: ضياء العزاوي) is an Iraqi painter and sculptor, now living and working in London, and one of the pioneers of modern Arab art. He is noted for incorporating Arabic script into his paintings. Active in the arts community, he founded the Iraqi art group known as New Vision and has been an inspiration to a generation of young, calligraffiti artists.

Life and career 
Dia al-Azzawi was born in al-Fadhil, an old traditional neighbourhood in Baghdad, in 1939. His father was a grocer in the city centre. Azzawi was the third of ten children in the family.

Azzawi studied archaeology at the College of Arts in Baghdad, graduating in 1962 and later studied at the Institute of Fine Arts, under the guidance of the eminent Iraqi artist, Hafidh al-Droubi, and graduating in 1964. By day, he studied the ancient world, and by night he studied European painting. Azzawi explains, "This contrast meant that I was working with European principles but at the same time using my heritage as part of my work." His exposure to archaeology would influence him greatly as an artist, and he drew inspiration from the ancient myths of Gilgamesh and Imam Hussein, a revered Muslim figure. Azzawi then continued to study art at the Institute of Fine Art, graduating in 1964.

In the 1950s, Azzawi began working with Iraqi artist, Faeq Hassan, who was involved with the Baghdadi arts group called “the Pioneers.” This group aimed to locate a continuity between traditional and contemporary Iraqi art. During this period, he began to develop his own aesthetic, and was inspired by dramatic moments in Iraq's history.

While enrolled at art school, he joined the local art group, known as the Impressionists, founded by his professor, Hafidh al-Droubi in 1953. While Azzawi was not particularly drawn to impressionism as a style, the group encouraged artists to experiment with different styles, and also to pursue local themes as subject matter. Through his involvement in this group, he began to explore Arab cultural history and mythology, which became recurring themes in his work. He continued his active involvement in Iraq's arts community by joining the group known as the Baghdad Modern Art Group, founded by the artist and intellectual, Shakir Hassan Al Said, in 1951, and later the New Vision Group, for which he wrote the manifesto, which was published in a Baghdad newspaper in 1968.

During a turbulent political period in Iraq, Azzawi served as a reservist in the Iraq army between 1966 and 1973, where he witnessed many atrocities. Through this experience, he learned that he needed to speak for those who have no voice. A number of his works are expressly designed to give a voice to those who have been silenced through war and conflict.

He held the positions of Director of the Iraqi Antiquities Department in Baghdad (1968–76) and Artistic Director of the Iraqi Cultural Centre in London, where he arranged a number of exhibitions.  He was the inaugural editor of the magazine, Ur (1978-1984) - a provactive new journal published by the Iraqi Cultural Centre in London. He was also the editor of Funoon Arabiyyah (1981-1982) and a member of the editorial board of the scholarly journal, Mawakif.

He was still living in Iraq when he witnessed the demise of the avantgarde art groups. At this time, he became more actively involved in the arts community. In 1968, he founded the pivotal Iraqi art group, Al-Ru’yah al-Jadida (New Vision) and wrote its manifesto, Towards a New Vision, which is co-signed by Ismail Fatah Al Turk. Al-Ru’yah al-Jadida represented a freer art style which encouraged artists to remain true to their own era., but also to look to heritage and tradition for inspiration. In this respect, it sought to maintain the broad trends of the prior art groups, such as the Baghdad Modern Group, but at the same time acknowledging that artists were already developed a more free style. This group promoted the idea of freedom of creativity within a framework of heritage. He was also a member of the group One Dimension founded by Shakir Hassan Al Said, which rejected the earlier modern Arab art movement as being too concerned with European techniques and aesthetics.

In the late 1970s, after Iraq fell under the control of Saddam Hussein, Azzawi left his home country  and settled in London where he met his first wife, the Swedish-born Shashten Finstrom, who worked at the Patrick Seale Gallery, where Azzawi had his first solo British exhibition in 1978.

Azzawi now spends his time living and working in both London and Dubai. In 1991, Azzawi fell into a state of despair when his saw the destruction to his native Iraq due to the Gulf War. He shut himself away in his home for several months, concentrating on his art and producing a series of works, including the Balad Al Sawad [Country of Blackness] series of  "violently drawn images of terrified, crying and screaming faces, haunting images of despair."

He is one of the pioneers of the modern Arab art world, with a special interest in the combination of Arabic traditions, including calligraphy, into modern art compositions.

In 2021, Tamayouz Excellence Award launched a prize named the Dia al-Azzawi Prize for Public Art, the recipient of the inaugural prize was the graffiti of Al-Tahrir tunnel in Baghdad by the Tishreen uprising Artists.

Works 

Azzawi was part of the generation of people that saw their countries and homelands fall to bloody dictatorships and wars,  and so much of his work is a commentary on the destruction and devastation of Iraq due to war and invasion.  His piece, My Broken Dream , a colossal monochromatic work, four meters in height and ten in length, is an assemblage of shapes, limps and swords, and it is an attempt to document a peoples pain, and in the written statement of the artwork, he writes, “Iraq is my inner soul." In addition, Azzawi does not only give voice to his own plight, but to those who are silenced as well, including that of Palestine and Iraqi Kurdistan. One example, The Land of Sad Oranges, is a set of black and white drawings consisting of faceless heads and limp bodies, based on the short story of the same name by Palestinian writer, Ghassan Kanafani.  Azzawi was inspired to draw this set after Kanafani, a close friend of his, was murdered in 1972 by the Mossad and in these drawings, he tries to explore the condition of statelessness and particularly the effect it has on the individual. In an interview with Saphora Smith for the Telegraph in 2016, Azzawi said, “I feel I am a witness. If I can give a voice to somebody who has no voice, that is what I should do,” and with this work he tries to document the inner struggle of refugees and explore themes of exile and displacement.

The art historian, Nada Shabout, has classified Dia Azzawi's work as belonging to the School of Calligraphic Art (also known as the Hurufiyya movement) using a style termed calligraphic combinations, which means that he combines abstract, freeform and classical styles.

His works are held in prestigious art galleries, art museums and public collections including in both the West and the Middle East: Vienna Public Collection; British Museum, London; Victoria and Albert Museum, London; Gulbenkian Collection, Barcelona; The World Bank, Washington D.C.; Library of Congress, Washington D.C.; Institut du Monde Arabe, Paris; Museum of Modern Art, Paris; Bibliothèque Nationale, Paris; Pier Gardin Collection, Paris; Museum of Modern Art, Baghdad; Museum of Modern Art, Damascus; Museum of Modern Art, Tunis; Arab Museum of Modern Art, Doha; Adel Mandil Collection, Riyadh; The Saudi Bank, London; Jeddah International Airport, Saudi Arabia; Riyadh International Airport, Saudi Arabia; The United Bank of Kuwait, London; Development Fund, Kuwait, Una Foundation, Morocco; Jordan National Gallery of Fine Arts, Amman; and the British Airways Collection, London.

A number of his works, formerly held in the Iraq National Museum of Modern Art, were subject to the looting that occurred in 2003 following the US invasion of Iraq. At least one of these, The Lost City, rated as one of the top 100 missing works, has since been repatriated. The stolen artworks have been involved in controversy within art circles. A private Iraqi seller, offered The Lost City, for sale with a $50,000 price tag, to a gallery in 2011, in spite of the fact that it was listed by Interpol as a stolen artwork. With the assistance of the gallery, US Embassy in Baghdad, Interpol and the FBI, the work was eventually recovered and returned to the rightful owner, the Iraq National Museum of Modern Art.

He has promoted Arabic art and culture through both his writing and his art. He has published some fourteen books, numerous articles and has edited art magazines. He was the Art Director of the International Magazine of Arab Culture, between 1978 and 1984.

Gallery

Select list of artworks

 Demonstration, oil on canvas, 1953 (now in the Al-Ruwad Collection, Baghdad) 
 Story from One Thousand and One Nights, ink on paper, 1962
 And Morning Reached Shahrazad, ink on paper, 1962
 Tragedy at Kabala, ink on paper, 1964
 Testimony of Our Times, 1972
 The Land of Sad Oranges, 1973 
 Introduction to the Seven Golden Orbs, silkscreen, 1978
Al-Jawahiri Verses, 50 X60cm, 1989
 The Crane, hand-coloured lithograph, 1990
 Balad Al Sawad [country of blackness] series of nine charcoal drawings on paper, c. 1991
 The Mulallaqast Pre-Islamic Pottery, etching, 50 X 70 cm, date unknown
 Sabra and Chatila Massacre 2012-2013  (now in the Tate Modern Gallery)

Exhibitions
Selected Individual Exhibitions

Selected Group Exhibitions

Public collections
 Tate Modern, London
 Mathaf: Arab Museum of Modern Art
 Sharjah Art Museum, UAE
 Barjeel Foundation, UAE

See also

 Hurufiyya movement
 Islamic art
 Islamic calligraphy
 List of Iraqi artists

External links
 Dia Azzawi at Art Iraq - digital resource maintained by Iraqi artists with reproductions of major modern artworks, many of which were stolen or damaged in the 2003 invasion, and are not accessible via any other reliable public source

References

1939 births
20th-century Iraqi painters
21st-century Iraqi painters
21st-century sculptors
Abstract painters
Artists from Baghdad
Iraqi calligraphers
Iraqi contemporary artists
Living people
War artists